Jaga mohan or Jagamohan or Jagamohana is an assembly hall in the Hindu temple architecture, especially in Orissa.

Overview
It is located between the temple entrance and the Garba griha that is to say, the heart of the sanctuary. It is typical of the Nagara architecture temples of northern India. In the south of India, the halls are named mandapas which are often large halls with columns.

As garbhagriha, it is most often built on a plan based on structures of squares and circles. However, for the temples of goddesses, the jaga mohan is built on a plan based on structures of rectangles and triangles. Such as for example the plan of the temple of Varahi Deula at Chaurasi near Puri in Orissa.

Generally the garbhagriha is a windowless and sparsely lit chamber, intentionally created thus to focus the devotee's mind on the tangible form of the divine within it. On the contrary, the jaga mohan is highly decorated with sculptures of deities, mythologic scenes or ornements.

The most famous is the one of the Temple of Surya at Konark. Due to the collapse of the main temple tower (shikhara), the jaga mohan now appears to be the main building of the temple.

Notes

External links 

 http://ganapati.perso.neuf.fr/anglais/aor/aor.html
 https://books.google.com/books?id=bGgf_LkeG2kC&pg=PA373

Architecture in India
Hindu temple architecture